Gary Glasgow (born 13 May 1976) is a Trinidadian former international football player who played professionally as a striker for North East Stars.

Career
Born in Arima, Glasgow played in Trinidad for San Juan Jabloteh, Defence Force, North East Stars, Joe Public and United Petrotrin; in the United States for New Orleans Storm, Richmond Kickers, Kansas City Wizards and Hampton Roads Mariners; and in China for Guangzhou and Henan Jianye.

References

External links

1976 births
Living people
Trinidad and Tobago footballers
Trinidad and Tobago international footballers
Sporting Kansas City players
San Juan Jabloteh F.C. players
Defence Force F.C. players
Virginia Beach Mariners players
North East Stars F.C. players
New Orleans Riverboat Gamblers players
Joe Public F.C. players
Richmond Kickers players
Guangzhou F.C. players
Henan Songshan Longmen F.C. players
China League One players
TT Pro League players
Trinidad and Tobago expatriates in China
1998 CONCACAF Gold Cup players
2007 CONCACAF Gold Cup players
Expatriate footballers in China
Major League Soccer players
A-League (1995–2004) players
People from Arima
Association football forwards